Robert Deane Kincaide (March 18, 1911 – August 14, 1992) was an American jazz reedman.

Kincaide was born in Houston, Texas, United States, but raised in Decatur, Illinois, and began playing professionally and working as an arranger in the early 1930s. He worked with Wingy Manone in 1932, then took a job with Ben Pollack from 1933 to 1935, also arranging for Benny Goodman on the side. He joined Bob Crosby's group in 1935, and worked with Woody Herman and Manone again; at the end of the decade he worked briefly with Tommy Dorsey. In the first half of the 1940s he worked with Joe Marsala, Glenn Miller, Ray Noble, and Muggsy Spanier. He served in the United States Navy during World War II, playing in a ship's band on the USS Franklin (CV-13). He joined Ray McKinley's band in 1946, working with him until 1950. From the 1950s until the early 1980s, Kincaide worked primarily as an arranger for television.

He died, aged 81, in St. Cloud, Florida.

References

Other sources
"Deane Kincaide". The New Grove Dictionary of Jazz. Second edition, ed. Barry Kernfeld.

1911 births
1992 deaths
American jazz clarinetists
American jazz saxophonists
American male saxophonists
Jazz musicians from Illinois
People from Decatur, Illinois
20th-century American saxophonists
20th-century American male musicians
American male jazz musicians
The Tonight Show Band members
United States Navy personnel of World War II